General elections were held in the Faroe Islands on 8 November 1950, the first after the granting of home rule two years earlier. The People's Party remained the largest party in the Løgting, winning 8 of the 25 seats.

Results

References

Faroe Islands
1950 in the Faroe Islands
Elections in the Faroe Islands
November 1950 events in Europe
Election and referendum articles with incomplete results